Archie Sloane "King" Cole (November 26, 1900 - January 10, 1952) was an American professional baseball pitcher in the Negro leagues. He played with the Toledo Tigers and Kansas City Monarchs in 1923 and the Detroit Stars in 1924. He is also listed as Archie Coley.

References

External links
 and Seamheads

Detroit Stars players
Kansas City Monarchs players
Toledo Tigers players
1900 births
1952 deaths
Baseball pitchers
Baseball players from Ohio
20th-century African-American sportspeople